Balavarman was successor and son of Samudravarman; ruled Kamarupa for the period 398–422.

Reign
He was known for great amount of physical strength as reflected in his name and courage. His soldiers are always on front against enemy. Balavarman fought wars with Samudra Gupta, in spite of relationship.

Family
His wife's name is Ratnavati who gave birth to Kalyanavarman. He arranged Svayamvara for his daughter Amritaprabha, which are attended by princes of different countries of Aryavarta. Rajtarangini of Kalhana gives detail accounts of this event. Princess eventually accepted prince of Kashmir Meghavahana as her groom. Amritaprabha established numerous Buddhist monasteries in Kashmir.

See also
 Varman Dynasty

References

Hindu monarchs
Varman dynasty
4th-century Indian monarchs